The 2018 FC Shakhter Karagandy season is the 27th successive season that the club will play in the Kazakhstan Premier League, the highest tier of association football in Kazakhstan. Shakhter will also participate in the Kazakhstan Cup.

Season events
On 9 January 2018, Uladzimir Zhuravel was appointed as Shakhter Karagandy's new manager. On 3 July, Zhuravel left Shakhter Karagandy by mutual consent with Andrei Finonchenko being appointed as Caretaker Manager On 18 July, Nikolay Kostov was confirmed as Shakhter Karagandy's new manager.

Squad

Transfers

In

Out

Loans in

Released

Friendlies

Competitions

Premier League

Results summary

Results by round

Results

League table

Kazakhstan Cup

Squad statistics

Appearances and goals

|-
|colspan="14"|Players away from Shakhter Karagandy on loan:
|-
|colspan="14"|Players who left Shakhter Karagandy during the season:

|}

Goal scorers

Disciplinary record

References

External links
Official Website

FC Shakhter Karagandy seasons
Shakhter Karagandy